Clear Lake Township may refer to the following townships in the United States:

 Clear Lake Township, Steuben County, Indiana
 Clear Lake Township, Sangamon County, Illinois
 Clear Lake Township, Cerro Gordo County, Iowa
 Clear Lake Township, Hamilton County, Iowa
 Clear Lake Township, Sherburne County, Minnesota